Bernam Street (Chinese: 柏南街) is a one-way street located in Tanjong Pagar in Singapore.

Bernam Street starts at its junction with Tanjong Pagar Road and ends with its junction with Anson Road.

Etymology
The street was named after the district of Perak, Malaysia and Bernam River in Malaysia. The naming was due to a 1898 municipal resolution to "use names of rivers and districts in the Malay Peninsula as being better adapted to the purpose [of naming streets] than the names of persons or families".

References 

Roads in Singapore
Downtown Core (Singapore)
Outram, Singapore